The Oceania Badminton Championships is a tournament organized by the Badminton Oceania (BO) and is held once every two years to crown the best badminton players and teams in Oceania.

Championships 
This championships established since 1997, and was held in North Harbour, New Zealand with individuals event only. The teams event started in 1999.

The table below gives an overview of all host cities and countries of the Oceania Championships.

Individual Event

Medal winners

Men's singles

Women's singles

Men's doubles

Women's doubles

Mixed doubles

Oceania Mixed Team Badminton Championships

Oceania Men's and Women's Team Badminton Championships 
Men's Team

Women's Team

References

External links
Official Website
tournamentsoftware.com

 
Recurring sporting events established in 1997
International badminton competitions

Badminton
1997 establishments in Oceania